Heinrich Schwemmer (28 March 1621 – 31 May 1696) was a German music teacher and composer.

He was born in Gumpertshausen bei Hallburg, Lower Franconia, and moved with his mother to Weimar after his father’s death in 1627, to get away from the Thirty Years War. After his mother's death in 1638, he moved to Coburg, then in 1641 to Nuremberg, where he remained for the rest of his life. He studied music with Kindermann at the Sebaldusschule, and in 1650 himself became a teacher, effectively a Kantor without the title; from 1656 he was Director chori musici along with Paul Hainlein. Along with Georg Caspar Wecker, he taught a generation of musicians in the tradition of the South German school, including Nikolaus Deinl, Johann Krieger, Johann Löhner, Johann Pachelbel, J.B. Schütz, and Maximilian Zeidler. Schwemmer taught singing, while Wecker gave instruction in keyboard playing and composition.

All his known compositions, of which there a considerable number in manuscript, are vocal works: mostly sacred strophic songs for weddings and funerals, with some cantatas and chorale concertos. He was a master of the concertato vocal style.

Sources
 Harold E. Samuel, 'Schwemmer, Heinrich', Grove Music Online ed. L. Macy (Accessed 2007-06-10)  
 Harold E. Samuel: The Cantata in Nuremberg during the Seventeenth Century (Ann Arbor, 1982)

External links

German Baroque composers
Organists and composers in the South German tradition
German male organists
German music educators
1621 births
1696 deaths
Pupils of Johann Erasmus Kindermann
17th-century classical composers
German male classical composers
17th-century male musicians
Male classical organists